Boris Vasilyevich Andreyev (21 January 1906 – 9 March 1987) was a Soviet shooter. He won a silver and a bronze medal at the 1952 Summer Olympics, aged 46, in the 50 metre rifle prone and 50 metre rifle three positions, respectively.  In the former event, both he and Iosif Sîrbu broke the world record by executing 40 ideal 10-point shots, but Sîrbu outscored Andreyev 33:28 by the number of hits into the central area of the 10-point black circle.

Andreev won national titles in 1929, 1930, 1933, 1946–1948 and 1951–1953. He graduated from a military academy of chemical defense and held a rank of lieutenant colonel. He was awarded the Order of Lenin, Order of the Red Banner and Order of the Red Star.

References

1906 births
1987 deaths
Soviet male sport shooters
Olympic shooters of the Soviet Union
Shooters at the 1952 Summer Olympics
Olympic bronze medalists for the Soviet Union
Olympic silver medalists for the Soviet Union
Olympic medalists in shooting
Medalists at the 1952 Summer Olympics